Gaza Ridge Barracks is an Australian Army base in the  suburb of Bandiana, located about  to the east of Wodonga, Victoria. Part of the Army Logistic Training Centre is based there.  It is also home to the Army Museum Bandiana, a large and diversified military museum that hosts a number of collections focussing on the history of the Army's logistic corps. Gaza Ridge Barracks is also the home to the 37th Australian Army Cadet Unit (37 ACU).

References

Barracks in Australia